Gas Huffer was an American garage rock band from Washington. They were known for their informal and comical lyrics and their antic-laden stage presence.

History 
Gas Huffer classified themselves loosely in the garage punk genre. The band created comic books with each album (drawn by all four members of the band, including Joe Newton, now deputy art director for Rolling Stone magazine), that contain the lyrics to the songs. This was done for every album up to (and including) "Just Beautiful Music".

Gas Huffer played its final show – dubbed "The Last Huffer" – at Seattle's Crocodile Cafe on January 14, 2006. Opening the show were Girl Trouble from Tacoma, Washington, and Canned Hamm  from Vancouver, British Columbia. At the conclusion of Girl Trouble's set, K.P. Kendall called Gas Huffer's Tom Price (who has been diagnosed with Parkinson's disease) to the stage and presented to him a "Certificate of Achievement".

Prior to Gas Huffer, Tom Price played with The U-Men.

Tom Price and Don Blackstone currently play in the Tom Price Desert Classic. Matt Wright was also briefly a member in the band, having appeared in its debut 7". The Tom Price Desert Classic LP "HELL" was released in September 2014.

The term "huffer" often refers to a form of substance abuse known as huffing.

Discography

Full-length 

Janitors of Tomorrow (1991) on Empty Records
Integrity, Technology & Service (1992) on Empty Records
One Inch Masters (1994) on Epitaph Records
The Inhuman Ordeal of Special Agent Gas Huffer (1996) on Epitaph Records
Just Beautiful Music (1998) on Epitaph Records
The Rest of Us (2002) on Estrus Records
Lemonade for Vampires (2005) on Estrus Records

EPs 

Beer Drinkin' Cavemen from Mars (1992) on Empty Records (European release only)
The Shrill Beeps of Shrimp (1993) on  Empty Records

Singles 

Firebug (1989) on Black Label Records
Ethyl (1990) on Black Label Records
Mole (1992)  on Sympathy for the Record Industry
Washtucna Hoe-down (1992) on Hayseed Records
Beer Drinking Cavemen from Mars/Hotcakes (1992) on Sub Pop
Ooh Ooh Ooh!/Flaming Star (1996) on Lance Rock Records
Rotten Egg/Old Summertime (2000) on Au Go Go Records

Splits 

King of Hubcaps (1991) split with Fastbacks
Knife Manual (1992) split with Mudhoney (You Stupid Asshole) on Empty Records (pressed on saw-shaped clear vinyl)
Bad Guy Reaction (1992) Gearhead magazine split with Supercharger
Teach Me to Kill (1994) split with Red Aunts

Music videos 

 Hot Cakes (1992)
 Crooked Bird (1994)
 More of Everything (1994)
 Sixty Three Hours (1996)
 Smile No More (1996)
 Rotten Egg (1998)

Compilations 

Another Damned Seattle Compilation Dashboard Hula Girl Records
Tracks and Fields: Kill Rock Stars Compilation
Runnin' on Fumes
Punk-O-Rama Vol. 4: Straight Outta the Pit
Punk-O-Rama Vol. 3
All Punk Rods!
Hype! The Motion Picture Soundtrack
Twisted Willie
Bite Back: Live at the Crocodile Cafe
Punk-O-Rama Vol. 1
Dope, Guns 'N Fucking in the Streets Vols. 4–7
Teriyaki Asthma Vols. 1–5
Bobbing for Pavement: The Rathouse Compilation
Empty Records Sampler
Street Sk8er

External links 
 "Enduring Seattle band Gas Huffer shuts off the pump and floors it" – January 13, 2006
 Interview on KUOW February 3, 2006. 28 minute interview, with some music samples from Lemonade for Vampires.
 Retrospective Audio interview with Gas Huffer on the Jekyll and Hyde show, 106FM Jerusalem

Musical quartets
Garage rock groups from Washington (state)
Cowpunk musical groups
Epitaph Records artists
Garage punk groups
Indie rock musical groups from Washington (state)
Musical groups established in 1989
Musical groups disestablished in 2006
American psychobilly musical groups
Sympathy for the Record Industry artists
Rock music groups from Washington (state)